= Camille Co-Koro =

Filipino fashion designer and content creator

- Born: Camille Co; Philippines
- Citizenship: Filipino
- Occupations: Fashion designer; Content creator; Entrepreneur
- Years active: 2011–present
- Spouse: Joni Koro
- Children: 2

Camille Co-Koro (née Co) is a Filipino fashion designer, style blogger, and content creator. She works in fashion and lifestyle content and has collaborated with local apparel brands.

== Career ==
Co started her blog in the early 2010s named Camille Co. She was one of the Filipino fashion bloggers who were active at that time, alongside with Tricia Gosingtian and Laureen Uy. Co with her initial blog posts focused on fashion, beauty, and travel, and was then published on sites such as Lookbook.nu.

In 2023 she collaborated with many Brand in the philippines. Including her collection and many fashion style.

In 2024 she launched Ckin, her own brand.

== Personal life ==
Co is married to Finnish entrepreneur Joni Koro. They have two daughters, Sienna and Bella.

In 2025 she addressed online confusion between herself and Claudine Co. She stated that she is not related to that family and that she would not change her surname.
